Lotta Lindgren (born 26 February 1993), known by her stage name Léon (stylized as LÉON), is a Swedish singer and songwriter born and raised in Stockholm, Sweden. Léon's rise to becoming an international music sensation began with the release of the single "Tired of Talking" on SoundCloud in July 2015. To date, Léon has released three full-length albums, LÉON, Apart, and most recently Circles. She also collaborated with Jonas Blue on the house single "Hear Me Say".

Career

Early life 
Lotta Lindgren was born in Stockholm, Sweden in 1993. She comes from a musical family: her mother is a cellist and her father is a composer and conductor. Léon began her musical career as front-woman of a hip hop and soul group in her teens before embarking on a solo career with producing partner Agrin Rahmani in 2015. She has cited Amy Winehouse, Janis Joplin, Beyoncé, Etta James, Sam Cooke, and Stevie Wonder as musical inspirations.

2015–2017: First EPs 
Her first single, "Tired of Talking", off her debut release, Treasure (EP), gained immediate attention earning praise from the music executive and producer Chris Anokute and getting a mention by the singer Katy Perry, who tweeted "she's one to watch!" The song went viral clocking up millions of plays on streaming platforms.

In October 2016, Léon played at the 31st edition of Eurosonic Noorderslag in Groningen, Netherlands. Her second EP, For You, was released on 3 March 2017, followed by Surround Me (EP) consisting of four tracks in October the same year.

2018–2019: Debut album 
Léon's first full-length album, titled LÉON, was released in March 2019 via her own LÉON Recordings in partnership with BMG. The album's release was preceded by the singles "Baby Don't Talk", "Falling" and the breakout song "You And I".

Produced by the production teams ELECTRIC and Captain Cuts, the album blends modern electronic production values and more intimate stripped down sounds, with varied styles ranging from synth-pop to retro-pop and soul.

The album was met with positive reviews from the critics, who praised its intricate melodies and intimate feel, comparing Leon's vocals with those of Stevie Nicks and Amy Winehouse. To promote the album, Léon embarked on a tour of Europe, the UK and USA.

2020–Present: Apart 
After a series of singles, including "And It Breaks My Heart" and "Chasing a Feeling", Léon released her sophomore studio album, Apart, in October 2020. Created in the midst of the COVID-19 pandemic, the album was recorded and produced from start to finish in her hometown of Stockholm, with an old time collaborator, Martin Stilling.

Though overall similar in sound to the debut album, Apart features a more stripped-back production and is more personal in nature. It has been characterized as a break-up album with songs filled with a sense of longing and nostalgia. The album received generally favourable reviews. Although critics noted that the album may be not as accomplished as Léon's first record – nor distinctly recognizable from it – they praised her song-writing abilities, and, like on her debut outing, her mature vocals.

In May 2021, Léon collaborated with Jonas Blue on the dance house single "Hear Me Say", which quickly amassed 18 million plays on streaming platforms. The video for the song, directed by Alex Nicholson, was released in July 2021.

In September 2021, a single, “Dancer”, was released.

Léon released her third studio album "Circles" on 4 March 2022. It includes previously released singles "Dancer", "Soaked", "Fade Into a Dream" and "Wishful Thinking".

Discography

Studio albums

Extended plays

Singles

Notes

Other songs

References 

Living people
Swedish songwriters
Swedish women singer-songwriters
Swedish singer-songwriters
Swedish pop singers
Singers from Stockholm
Musicians from Stockholm
English-language singers from Sweden
21st-century Swedish singers
1993 births
21st-century Swedish women singers